Mount Hobbs is a mountain,  high, the highest summit of the Williams Hills in the Neptune Range of the Pensacola Mountains, Antarctica. It was mapped by the United States Geological Survey from surveys and U.S. Navy air photos from 1956 to 1966, and was named by the Advisory Committee on Antarctic Names for Ensign James W. Hobbs of the U.S. Navy, who was part of the Ellsworth Station winter party of 1958.

References

Mountains of Queen Elizabeth Land
Pensacola Mountains